The LiAZ-677 is a Soviet and Russian city high-floor bus produced by the Likinsky Bus Plant. The first prototype was released in 1963, and mass-produced from 1967 to 1994. Third-party car kits assembly lasted until 2002. The LiAZ-677 was the most popular model of the plant, and the first Soviet bus with a hydromechanical (automatic) gearbox. This model was used by urban or suburban bus service in almost all cities of the Soviet Union.

References

Sources 
  В. Кузнецов. Новый городской автобус «ЛиАЗ-677» // журнал «Наука и жизнь», № 5, 1967. стр.44—51

Vehicles introduced in 1967
Buses of the Soviet Union